Persian mysticism, or the Persian love tradition, is a traditional interpretation of existence, life and love, reliant upon revelatory and heart-felt principles in reasoning. Though partially sourced from the mystical Zoroastrian traditions of the Persian Empire, in its contemporary practical aspects it is now synonymous with Sufism in contemporary Iran.

Thought
Persian mystical thought has been analysed critically by Abdolhossein Zarrinkoub, Abdolkarim Soroush, and Dariush Shayegan. In Rumi, one can find love-based mysticism; in Hafiz the pleasure-based mysticism. Under Rumi's influences, Abdolkarim Soroush is currently working on power-based or epic mysticism.

Medieval Persian mystical figures

Modern art and the Persian mystical tradition
Persian mysticism has a significant impact on Iranian modern art.

See also
Persian poetry
Persian traditional music
Persianate society

References

Persian philosophy
Persian culture
Esoteric interpretation of the Quran